Lauren Albanese (born October 1, 1989, in Jacksonville, Florida) is an American inactive tennis player.

She began her professional career in 2006. Her highest WTA singles ranking is 158, which she reached on June 15, 2009. Her career high in doubles is 213, which she reached on February 28, 2011.

ITF finals

Singles (3–10)

Doubles (5–8)

External links
 
 

1989 births
Living people
American female tennis players
Sportspeople from Jacksonville, Florida
Tennis people from Florida
21st-century American women